Levchenko (Leuchanka, Leŭčanka) is a surname of Ukrainian origin. It derives from the personal name Levko. The surname, Levchenko, was created by adding the Ukrainian patronimic suffix, -enko,  meaning someone of Levko, usually the son of Levko.

People
 Anatoli Levchenko (1941–1988), Soviet-Ukrainian cosmonaut
 Andriy Levchenko (born 1985), Ukrainian volleyball player
 Gordey Levchenko (1897–1981), Soviet naval commander and admiral
 Ihor Levchenko (born 1991), Ukrainian footballer
 Irina Levchenko (1924-1973), Russian tank commander
 Kseniia Levchenko (born 1996), Russian basketball player
 Nadezhda Levchenko (born 1960), Soviet sprint canoer
 Sergey Levchenko (born 1953), Russian politician
 Serhiy Levchenko (1981–2007), Ukrainian footballer
 Stanislav Levchenko (born 1941), Russian KGB major and defector to the United States
 Vitaliy Levchenko (born 1972), Tajik-Ukrainian footballer
 Volodymyr Levchenko (1944–2006), Soviet-Ukrainian footballer
 Yuliya Levchenko (born 1997), Ukrainian high jumper
 Yaroslav Levchenko (born 1987), Russian modern painter
 Yevhen Levchenko (born 1978), Ukrainian footballer

See also
 

Ukrainian-language surnames
Patronymic surnames
Surnames from given names
Surnames of Ukrainian origin